Francis Leo (born June 30, 1971), better known as Frank Leo, is a Canadian prelate of the Catholic Church who has been appointed Metropolitan Archbishop of Toronto after serving as auxiliary bishop of Montreal for five months.

Biography
Leo was born in Montreal on June 30, 1971. He earned a bachelor's degree at the Institut de Formation Théologique de Montréal (IFTM) and both a licentiate and a doctorate in theology at the International Marian Research Institute. He was ordained a priest of the Archdiocese of Montreal in 1996. He studied at the Pontifical Ecclesiastical Academy in Rome from 2006 to 2008 and then joined the diplomatic service of the Holy See. He was posted to the apostolic nunciature in Australia from 2008 to 2011 and then to the Holy See Study Mission in Hong Kong for the year 2011 to 2012.

In 2012 he returned to Montreal to take up appointments as director and dogmatics teacher at the Major Seminary, director of the IFTM's Department of Canon Law, and vice president of the archdiocesan vocations service. From 2013 to 2015 he was a member of the priests council. He founded the Canadian Mariological Society and became its president. From 2015 to 2021 he was secretary general of the Canadian Conference of Catholic Bishops.

In February 2022 he became vicar general and moderator of the curia for the Archdiocese of Montreal. 

On July 16, 2022, Pope Francis appointed him titular bishop of Tamada and auxiliary bishop of Montreal. He received his episcopal consecration on September 12, 2022.

On February 11, 2023, Pope Francis appointed him Metropolitan Archbishop of Toronto. His installation is scheduled for March 25, in St. Michael's Cathedral Basilica.

References 
 

1971 births
Living people
Pontifical Ecclesiastical Academy alumni
Diplomats of the Holy See
Clergy from Montreal
Bishops appointed by Pope Francis
21st-century Roman Catholic archbishops in Canada

External Links 
 Archbishop Frank Leo, Catholic Hierarchy
<!--

 -/>